The Women's long jump at the 2014 Commonwealth Games, as part of the athletics programme, was a two-day event held at Hampden Park on 30 and 31 July 2014.

Records

Qualifying round

Final round

References

Women's long jump
2014
2014 in women's athletics